This page provides the summary of BOTY Korea held in Korea. Winner advances to BOTY International also known as Battle of the Year.

Winners
Crew in Bold went on and won BOTY International.

Format
Prior showcases are held to determine crew seeding and which crews advance to the battle rounds.

2013 BOTY Korea Preliminaries

MC:
MC Go
Judges:
Dyzee (SuperNaturalz)
Wing (Jinjo)
The End (Gamblerz)
Crews in bold won their respective battles. Brother From Whole and Universal Crew did not qualify for the battle rounds.

Fusion MC won BOTY Korea 2013 and represented Korea at BOTY International held in Germany.

2012 BOTY Korea Preliminaries

Crews in bold won their respective battles. MB Crew did not qualify for the battle rounds.

Morning of Owl won BOTY Korea 2012 and represented Korea at BOTY International.

2011 BOTY Korea Preliminaries

Crews in bold won their respective battles. MB Crew and Fresh Family did not qualify for the battle rounds.

Maximum Crew  won BOTY Korea 2011 and represented Korea at BOTY International.

External links
 Battle of the Year official website
  BOTY Korea Winners

Breakdance
Street dance competitions
South Korean breakdancing groups